This is a list of schools who field women's volleyball teams in Division I of the National Collegiate Athletic Association (NCAA) in the United States.

As of the 2022 season, there are over 330 schools in 22 Division I volleyball conferences. Conference affiliations and venues represent those for the 2023 NCAA women's volleyball season.

Programs

Notes

Future programs

See also

 NCAA Division I Women's Volleyball Championship
 List of NCAA men's volleyball programs

References

NCAA Division I women's volleyball Programs
Volleyball, Womens
Women's sport-related lists